Ngapoi Ngawang Jigme (February 1, 1910 – December 23, 2009) was a Tibetan senior official who assumed various military and political responsibilities both before and after 1951 in Tibet. He is often known simply as Ngapo in English sources.

Early life 
Ngapoi Ngawang Jigme was born in Lhasa as the son of a leading Tibetan aristocratic family descended from former kings of Tibet, the Horkhang. His father was governor of Chamdo in Eastern Tibet and commander of the Tibetan armed forces. After studying traditional Tibetan literature, he went to Britain for further education. He was married to Ngapoi Cedain Zhoigar, Vice President of the Tibetan Women's Federation, hence his name Ngapoi.

Career 
Upon returning in 1932 from his studies in Britain, he served in the Tibetan army. Ngapoi began his career as a local official in Chamdo in 1936. As a cabinet member of the former government of Tibet under the Dalai Lama, he advocated reform. In April 1950 he was appointed governor-general (commissioner) of Chamdo, but took office only in September, after the previous governor, Lhalu, had left for Lhasa.

Commander-in-chief of the Tibetan Army at Chamdo 

While serving as governor-general of Chamdo, he also became commander-in-chief of the Tibetan Army.

While his predecessor, Lhalu, had made elaborate military plans and fortifications and asked the Kashag for more soldiers and weapons to stop the People's Liberation Army from entering Tibet, Ngapoi had the fortifications removed, refused to hire Khampa warriors and to install two portable wireless sets as he thought it was better to negotiate.

In October 1950 his forces confronted the People's Liberation Army. The battle was quickly over. As he had warned before his departure for Chamdo, "the Tibetan forces were no match for the PLA who [...] had liberated the whole of China by defeating several million Kuomintang soldiers". Ngapoi surrendered Chamdo to the Chinese. The PLA surprised him by treating him well and giving him long lectures on the New China's policies toward minor nationalities. Within a year, he was the deputy commander-in-chief for the PLA forces in Tibet. He became a leader not only of Tibet but also the Chinese Communist Party in Tibet.

Head of the Tibetan Delegation to the Beijing Peace Negotiations 

As a delegate of the government of Tibet sent to negotiate with the Chinese Government, he headed the Tibetan delegation to the Beijing peace negotiations in 1951, where he signed the Seventeen Point Agreement for the Peaceful Liberation of Tibet with the Chinese Communist government in 1951, accepting Chinese sovereignty in exchange for guarantees of autonomy and religious freedom.

The validity of his acceptance on behalf of the Tibetan government has been questioned. The Tibetan exiled community claims that his signature of the Agreement was obtained under duress, and that, as only the governor of Chamdo, signature of the agreement exceeded his powers of representation and is therefore invalid.

In his biography My Land and My People, the Dalai Lama claims that in 1952, the acting Tibetan Prime Minister Lukhangwa told Chinese representative Zhang Jingwu that the Tibetan "people did not accept the agreement".

However, according to Sambo Rimshi, one of the Tibetan negotiators, the Tibetan delegation, including Ngapoi Ngawang Jigme, went to Beijing with the Dalai Lama's authorization and instructions As Sambo Rimchi recalled, Dalai Lama's instruction to the negotiators clearly states:

According to Sambo, the young Dalai Lama also told the negotiators to use their best judgment according to the situation and circumstances and report back to the Kashag in Yadong. Sambo recalled that the negotiators brought a secret codebook so that they could establish a wireless link with Yadong and discuss issues as they arose. According to historians Tom A. Grunfeld, Melvyn C. Goldstein and Tsering Shakya, the young Dalai Lama did ratify the Seventeen Point agreement with Tsongdu Assembly's recommendation few months after the signing.

In 1959, the Dalai Lama on his arrival in India after he fled Tibet repudiated the "17-point Agreement" as having been "thrust upon Tibetan Government and people by the threat of arms".

An advocate of reform 
Ngapoi Ngawang Jigmé was one of a small number of progressive elite Tibetans that were eager to modernize Tibet and saw in the return of the Chinese an opportunity to do so. They were in a sense a continuation of the movement for reform that emerged in the 1920s with Tsarong Dzasa as its main proponent but was stopped short by the 13th Dalai Lama under the pressure of conservative clerics and aristocrats.

Implementing the Seventeen Point Agreement (1951–1952) 

Ngapoi Ngawang Jigme was instrumental in solving the food problems of the People's Liberation Army in 1951–1952 by creating a Kashag subcommittee tasked with inventorying grain stores with a view to selling some to the PLA in accordance with point 16 of the Seventeen Point Agreement ("The local government of Tibet will assist the People's Liberation Army in the purchase of food, fodder, and other daily necessities.").

A Kashag minister trusted by both the Chinese and the Dalai Lama (1953–1954) 
Ngapoi was appointed by the Tibetan government to head the newly formed Reform Assembly. He was the Kashag minister (Kalön) most trusted not only by the Chinese but also by the Dalai Lama. The latter, who was in favour of reforms and modernization, frequently discussed political issues with Ngapoi in private. As a result, in 1953–1954, the Reform Assembly crafted new laws reforming interest rates, old loans, and the administration of counties.

Administrative, military, and legislative responsibilities 

After 1951, Ngapoi's career continued within the ranks of Chinese Communist administration of Tibet. He served as the leader of the Liberation Committee of Chamdo Prefecture until 1959. He was also a member of the Central People's Government's State Ethnic Affairs Commission and the CPPCC National Committee between 1951 and 1954.

He was Deputy Commander of the Tibet Military District between 1952 and 1977, and a member of the National Defence Council from 1954 through the Cultural Revolution. He was appointed as lieutenant general and awarded the "Order of Liberation" first class in 1955.

Secretary General of the Preparatory Committee for the Tibet Autonomous Region 
When in April 1956 a Preparatory Committee for the Establishment of the Autonomous Region of Tibet was set up in accordance with the central government's decision, Ngapoi Ngawang Jigme was appointed its secretary general. He was appointed vice-president of the Committee in 1959, the 10th Panchen Lama being its president.

Chairman of the People's Committee of the Tibet Autonomous Region 

After his appointment as acting chairman of the Preparatory Committee of the Tibet Autonomous Region in 1964, Ngapoi Ngawang Jigme became the chairman of the People's Committee of the newly established Tibet Autonomous Region (TAR) in 1965.

Vice Chairman of the Standing Committee of the National People's Congress 
He represented Tibet in seven National People's Congresses as a Vice Chairman of the Standing Committee from the 1st National People's Congress in 1954 to the 7th in 1988. He was head of the NPC delegations to Colombia, Guyana, West Indies, Sri Lanka and Nepal in the early 1980s.

In 1999, he became a member of the Preparatory Committee for the Special Administrative Region of Macau.

From 1979 to 1993, he was Chairman of the National People's Congress Ethnic Affairs Committee.

Other roles 
He was an honorary president of the Buddhist Association of China beginning in 1980. He was also an honorary president of the Tibetan Wildlife Protection Association, which was founded in 1991 He was also president of the China Association for the Preservation and Development of Tibetan Culture, which was established on June 21, 2004.

Death 
Ngapoi died at 16:50 on December 23, 2009, from an unspecified illness in Beijing at the age of 99 (or 100 according to East Asia's custom of counting a person's age by starting from 1 at the time of his or her birth). His funeral was held at the Funeral Parlor of the Babaoshan Revolutionary Cemetery on the morning of December 28.

He was described as "a great patriot, renowned social activist, good son of Tibetan people, outstanding leader of China's ethnic work and close friend of the CPC", by the Central Committee of the Chinese Communist Party (CCP).

Almost all the top leaders of the Chinese Communist Party turned up to pay him respects at his funeral, including CCP General-secretary Hu Jintao, ex-general secretary Jiang Zemin, Wu Bangguo, Wen Jiabao, Jia Qinglin, Li Changchun, Xi Jinping, He Guoqiang, Zhou Yongkang, etc. This shows that he was highly esteemed in China.

The Tibetan government in exile headed by Prof. Samdhong Rinpoche called him an "honest and patriotic" person who made great efforts to preserve and promote the Tibetan language. "He was someone who upheld the spirit of the Tibetan people."

As journalist Kalsang Rinchen observes, both Beijing and Dharamsala appear saddened by the demise of the man who signed the 17-point agreement. "[The] Chinese state run news agency Xinhua hailed him for ushering in 'major milestones in Tibet, such as the democratic reforms and the founding of the Autonomous Regional Government,' while the Tibetan government in exile remembered him for calling on the Central Government in 1991 'to implement articles of the 17-point Agreement in general and specifically those articles which state that Tibet's political status will not be changed'."

A rare comment on Ngapoi Ngawang Jigme can be found in the memoirs of Phuntsok Tashi, a Tibetan who served as an interpreter in the 1951 peace negotiations and signing of the Seventeen Point Agreement: Ngapoi is portrayed as "an honest, clever, intelligent, experienced and far-seeing man."

Quotations 

 According to the Tibetan government in exile special envoy Lodi Gyari Rinpoche, he said in 1988: "It is because of the special situation in Tibet that in 1951 the Seventeen Point Agreement for the Peaceful Liberation of Tibet, between the central people's government and the local Tibetan government, came about. Such an agreement has never existed between the central government and any other minority region. We have to consider the special situation in Tibetan history while drafting policies for Tibet in order to realise its long-term stability. We must give Tibet more autonomous power than other minority regions. In my view, at present, the Tibet Autonomous Region has less autonomy than other autonomous regions, let alone compared with provinces. Therefore Tibet must have some special treatment and have more autonomy like those special economic zones. We must employ special policies to resolve the special characteristics which have pertained throughout history.". This was translated by Tibet Information Network in 1992 from a 1988 issue of the Bulletin of the History of the Tibet Communist Party.
 According to the secretary of TGE's Department of Information and International Relations Tempa Tsering, he is on record as having said on August 31, 1989, in Tibet Daily, that the claim by the Dalai Lama's envoy "Wu Zhongxin of having presided over the enthronement ceremony (of the 14th Dalai Lama) on the basis of this photograph (of the Chinese official with the young Dalai Lama, supposed to have been taken on this occasion) is a blatant distortion of historical facts.".
 "Whether Tibet is independent or not can be clearly seen from the historical records in Chinese and Tibetan languages or from many existing historical relics such as seals of authority and golden sheets that the emperor gave to the rulers of Tibet. The Tang Dynasty had an intimate relationship. Since the Yuan Dynasty, Tibet has been formally incorporated into the jurisdiction of the Central Government and has been in existence for over 740 years. This means that the so-called "Tibetan independence" is entirely unfounded and untenable."

Published works 
 Ngapo Ngawang Jigmei et al., Tibet (with a foreword by Harrison Salisbury), Edmonton: Hurtig Publishers, or New York: McGraw-Hill Book Company, 1981, 296 p. (a coffee-table book)
 On the 1959 Armed Rebellion, in China Report, 1988, vol. 24, pp. 377–382.
 A great Turn in the Development of Tibetan History, published in the first issue of the China Tibetology quarterly, Beijing, 1991 / Grand tournant historique au Tibet, in La Tibétologie en Chine, n° 1, 1991.
 On Tibetan Issues, Beijing, New Star Publishers, 1991.
 Narrator in Masters of the Roof of the Wind, a documentary on feudalism in old Tibet
 Ngapoi recalls the founding of the TAR, an interview published by Chinaview, on August 30, 2005.

Notes

References

Citations

Sources 

 
 Melvyn Goldstein (2007). A History of Modern Tibet, Volume 2: The Calm Before the Storm: 1951–1955, University of California Press. .
 Anna Louise Strong (1959). Tibetan Interviews, Peking: New World Press (contains Ngapoi Ngawang Jigme's account of the Chamdo battle and his conversations with the author)
 Puncog Zhaxi (Phuntsok Tashi) (2005). La libération pacifique du Tibet comme je l'ai vécue, in Jianguo Li (ed.), Cent ans de témoignages sur le Tibet: reportages de témoins de l'histoire du Tibet, 196 p.
 Li Jianxiong (April 2004). Ngapoi Ngawang Jigme, China Tibetology Publishing House
 Powers, John (2017). The Buddha Party: How the People's Republic of China Works to Define and Control Tibetan Buddhism, Oxford University Press. .

External links 
 
 
 
 
 
 
 "Interview with Ngapoi Ngawang Jigme", South China Morning Post, 4 April 1998 Hosted by the Canada Tibet Committee
 Ngapoi recalls the founding of the TAR, www.chinaview.cn, 2005-08-30
 Group of photos of Ngapoi Ngawang Jigmei, Tibet328.cn, 12-25-2009
 Ngapoi Ngawang Jigme's life in pictures, China Tibetology Network site

Tibetan politicians
1910 births
2009 deaths
Political office-holders in Tibet
People from Lhasa
People's Republic of China politicians from Tibet
People's Liberation Army generals from Tibet
Delegates to the 1st National People's Congress
Delegates to the 2nd National People's Congress
Vice Chairpersons of the National Committee of the Chinese People's Political Consultative Conference
Vice Chairpersons of the National People's Congress
Burials at Babaoshan Revolutionary Cemetery
Chairpersons of the National People's Congress Ethnic Affairs Committee